This is a list of valleys of Utah. Valleys are ordered alphabetically by county and then for the entire state.

Beaver County

 Beaver Valley (Utah)
 Hamlin Valley
 Milford Valley
 Pine Valley (Beaver, Millard, Iron counties, Utah) (in Beaver, north Iron, and south Millard counties)
 Wah Wah Valley

Box Elder County

 Bear River Valley
 Blue Creek Valley
 Curlew Valley
 Junction Valley
 Upper Raft River Valley

Cache County

 Ant Valley
 Cache Valley

Carbon County

 Castle Valley (Carbon, Emery, and Sevier counties, Utah)
 Emma Park
 Whitmore Park

Daggett County

 Lucerne Valley

Davis County

 Salt Lake Valley

Duchesne County

 Pleasant Valley
 Roosevelt Valley

Emery County

 Antelope Valley (Wayne-Emery counties, Utah)
 Castle Valley (Carbon, Emery, and Sevier counties, Utah)
 Gunnison Valley (Emery and Grand counties, Utah)
 Joe's Valley
 San Rafael Valley

Garfield County

 Bear Valley Junction, Utah
 Circle Valley'
 Johns Valley
 Mammoth Valley
 Upper Valley

Grand County

 Castle Valley (Grand County, Utah)
 Gunnison Valley (Emery and Grand counties, Utah)
 Grand Valley (Colorado-Utah)
 Salt Valley

Iron County

 Cedar Valley (Iron County, Utah)
 Lower Bear Valley
 Parowan Valley
 Pine Valley (Beaver, Millard, Iron counties, Utah) (in Beaver, north Iron, and south Millard counties)
 Upper Bear Valley

Juab County

 Deep Creek Valley
 Dugway Valley
 Fish Springs Flat
 Johnson Canyon (Juab County, Utah)
 Juab Valley
 Little Valley (Utah)
 Snake Valley (Great Basin)

Kane County

 Kimball Valley
 Long Valley (Kane County, Utah)
 Long Valley Junction, Utah
 Mammoth Valley
 Navajo Valley-(at northeast Lake Powell)

Millard County

 Antelope Valley (southeast Millard County, Utah)
 Antelope Valley (southwest Millard County, Utah)
 Ferguson Desert
 Pahvant Valley
 Pine Valley (Beaver, Millard, Iron counties, Utah) (in Beaver, north Iron, and south Millard counties)
 Round Valley (Millard County, Utah)
 Scipio Valley
 Snake Valley (Great Basin)
 Tule Valley
 Wah Wah Valley
 Whirlwind Valley

Piute County

 Circle Valley
 Grass Valley (Piute and Sevier counties, Utah)

Salt Lake County

 Salt Lake Valley

San Juan County

 Dry Valley (San Juan Valley)
 Lisbon Valley
 Monument Valley
 Spanish Valley, Utah
 Valley of the Gods

Sanpete County

 Antelope Valley (Sanpete County, Utah)
 Gunnison Valley (Sanpete and Sevier counties, Utah)
 Sanpete Valley

Sevier County

 Castle Valley (Carbon, Emery, and Sevier counties, Utah)
 Central Valley, Utah
 Grass Valley (Piute and Sevier counties, Utah)
 Gunnison Valley (Sanpete and Sevier counties, Utah)
 Plateau Valley (Utah)

Summit County

 Rhodes Valley
 Snyderville Basin, (Round Valley (Utah))

Tooele County

 Deep Creek Valley
 Dugway Valley
 Falcon Valley
 Ripple Valley
 Rush Valley
 Skull Valley (Utah)
 Snake Valley (Great Basin)
 Tooele Valley

Uintah County

 Ashley Valley
 Diamond Valley (Uintah County, Utah), at Diamond Mountain Plateau
 Pleasant Valley
 Roosevelt Valley

Utah County

 Cedar Valley (Utah County, Utah)
 Goshen Valley
 Utah Valley

Washington County

 Diamond Valley (Washington County, Utah)
 Pine Valley (Washington County, Utah)
 Pine Valley, Utah
 Warner Valley

Wayne County

 Antelope Valley (Wayne and Emery counties, Utah)
 Blue Valley Benches
 Cathedral Valley
 Dry Valley (Wayne County, Utah)

Weber County

 Ogden Valley

Alphabetical listing for entire state

A
 Ant Valley
 Antelope Valley (southeast Millard County, Utah)
 Antelope Valley (southwest Millard County, Utah)
 Antelope Valley (Sanpete County, Utah)
 Antelope Valley (Wayne and Emery counties, Utah)
 Ashley Valley

B
 Bear River Valley
 Bear Valley Junction, Utah
 Beaver Valley (Utah)
 Blue Creek Valley
 Blue Valley Benches

C
 Cache Valley
 Castle Valley (Carbon, Emery, and Sevier counties, Utah)
 Castle Valley (Grand County, Utah)
 Cathedral Valley
 Cedar Valley (Iron County, Utah)
 F (Utah County, Utah)
 Central Valley, Utah
 Circle Valley
 Curlew Valley

D
 Deep Creek Valley
 Deer Creek Valley
 Diamond Valley (Uintah County, Utah)
 Diamond Valley (Washington County, Utah)
 Dry Valley (Wayne County, Utah)
 Dry Valley (San Juan Valley)
 Dugway Valley

E
 Emma Park

F
 Falcon Valley
 Ferguson Desert
 Fish Springs Flat

G
 Goshen Valley
 Grand Valley (Colorado-Utah)
 Grass Valley (Piute and Sevier counties, Utah)
 Gunnison Valley (Emery and Grand counties, Utah)
 Gunnison Valley (Sanpete and Sevier counties, Utah)

H
 Hamlin Valley

J
 Joe's Valley
 Johns Valley
 Juab Valley
 Junction Valley

K
 Kimball Valley

L
 Lisbon Valley
 Little Valley (Utah)
 Long Valley (Kane County, Utah)
 Long Valley Junction, Utah
 Lower Bear Valley
 Upper Bear Valley
 Lucerne Valley

M
 Mammoth Valley
 Milford Valley
 Monument Valley

N
 Navajo Valley-(at northeast Lake Powell)

O
 Ogden Valley

P
 Pavant Valley
 Parowan Valley
 Pine Valley (Beaver, Millard, Iron counties, Utah)
 Pine Valley (Washington County, Utah)
 Pine Valley, Utah
 Pine Valley (Beaver, Millard, Iron counties, Utah) (in Beaver, north Iron, and south Millard counties)
 Plateau Valley (Utah)
 Pleasant Valley

R
 Rhodes Valley
 Ripple Valley
 Roosevelt Valley
 Snyderville Basin, (Round Valley (Utah))
 Rush Valley

S
 Salt Lake Valley
 Salt Valley
 San Rafael Valley
 Sanpete Valley
 Scipio Valley
 Skull Valley (Utah)
 Snake Valley (Great Basin)
 Spanish Valley, Utah

T
 Tooele Valley
 Tule Valley

U
 Upper Bear Valley
 Lower Bear Valley
 Upper Raft River Valley
 Upper Valley
 Utah Valley

V
 Valley of the Gods

W
 Wah Wah Valley
 Warner Valley
 Whirlwind Valley
 Whitmore Park

See also
 List of mountain ranges of Utah
 List of plateaus and mesas of Utah
 List of rivers of Utah

External links

 
Valleys
Utah